Zack Anthony Forde-Hawkins (born May 8, 1979) is a Democratic member of the North Carolina House of Representatives. He has represented the 31st district (including constituents in eastern Durham County) since 2019.

Career
Forde-Hawkins won the election on November 6, 2018 from the platform of Democratic Party. He secured eighty-one percent of the vote while his closest rival Republican Torian Webson secured sixteen percent. He was re-elected to a second term in 2020, defeating frequent Libertarian candidate Sean Haugh.

Electoral history

2020

2018

Committee assignments

2021-2022 session
Appropriations
Appropriations - Education
Energy and Public Utilities
Marine Resources and Aqua Culture
Redistricting
Transportation

2019-2020 session
Appropriations
Appropriations - Capital
Energy and Public Utilities
Redistricting

References

External links

Living people
1979 births
People from Durham, North Carolina
Elizabeth City State University alumni
North Carolina Central University alumni
21st-century American politicians
21st-century African-American politicians
Democratic Party members of the North Carolina House of Representatives